From List of National Natural Landmarks, these are the National Natural Landmarks in Pennsylvania.  There are 27 in total.

References

Pennsylvania
National Natural Landmarks